The Magic Hour is  an American  talk show hosted by basketball player Earvin "Magic" Johnson.  The series aired in syndication from June to September 1998.

Synopsis
Soon after its debut, the series was panned by critics citing Johnson's apparent nervousness as a host, his overly complimentary tone with his celebrity guests, and lack of chemistry with his sidekick, comedian Craig Shoemaker.  The series was quickly retooled with Shoemaker being relieved of his 'sidekick' responsibilities and relegated to the supporting cast after the third episode.  Comedian Steve White (who had been part of the supporting cast) became the new sidekick for a period of time.  Radio personality and UPN Sports host Kenny Sargent was considered for Johnson’s new Ed McMahon styled side man, but finally comedian  and actor Tommy Davidson was brought in as the new sidekick and Johnson interacted more with the show band leader Sheila E.  Jimmy Hodson was the show's announcer and a comedy cast member.  The format of the show was also changed to include more interview time with celebrity guests.

Howard Stern appearance
One vocal critic of The Magic Hour was Howard Stern. Stern would regularly mock Johnson's diction and hosting abilities on his popular morning show. In an attempt to confront Stern (and to boost ratings), Stern was booked to appear on the show as a guest (along with Playboy Playmate Karen McDougal). Stern appeared on the July 2 broadcast with the band, the Losers, and played the song "Wipe Out". While being interviewed by Johnson, Stern asked Johnson about his lifestyle prior to contracting HIV and if he practiced safe sex with his wife. Stern also asked about "the white guy comedian", referring to Johnson's previous sidekick, Craig Shoemaker, who had been fired shortly before Stern's appearance for publicly calling the show "an absolute nightmare" (Stern mocked Shoemaker's short-lived replacement, Steve White, predicting he wouldn't last long, which came true).

Cancellation
The highly publicized episode featuring Stern increased viewership for a time, but ratings soon dropped off. The series was canceled after eight weeks.

Johnson later blamed the demise of his talk show on a lack of support from black celebrities who refused or could not appear on his show. Johnson claimed, "Their managers and agents keep them off of the black shows."

In popular culture

In his book What Were They Thinking? The 100 Dumbest Events in Television History, author David Hofstede ranked the show at #26 on the list.

See also
 The Chevy Chase Show
 The New Tom Green Show

References

External links
 
 Stern and the Losers Make Magic Happen
 Inside Howard's Magic Appearance

1998 American television series debuts
1998 American television series endings
1990s American television talk shows
1990s American late-night television series
1990s American variety television series
English-language television shows
First-run syndicated television programs in the United States
Television series by 20th Century Fox Television
Magic Johnson